VSI Tampa Bay FC was an American soccer team based in Plant City, Florida that played in the USL Premier Development League (PDL), the fourth tier of the American soccer pyramid, from 2012 to 2013. The team was owned by VisionPro Sports Institute and was affiliated with the VSI Tampa Bay FC professional men's team in the USL Pro, the VSI Tampa Bay FC women's team in the W-League, and the youth team in the Super-20 League. All the teams were disbanded in 2013.

History
The VSI Tampa Flames were established in 2011 as part of a broader move by the English football development academy, VisionPro Sports Institute, to build a foundation for youth and professional soccer in the United States. VSI partnered with the local Brandon, Florida area youth soccer organization, West Florida Flames, to build "the perfect platform for vertical progression, giving talented youngsters the opportunity to progress from junior soccer all the way through to the professional game," according to VSI's CEO, Simon Crane.

The USL PDL Team started play in 2012. The PDL Team finished with a record of 7 Wins, 5 Losses and 4 Ties. The team played their matches at JC Handly Sports Complex. In 2013, the team played their home matches at Plant City Stadium.

On November 22, 2012, the team's parent club changed its name to "VSI Tampa Bay FC" and the PDL Team followed suit. The team folded after the 2013 season.

Players and Staff

Current roster
As of July 15, 2013

Staff
  John Mitchell – Head of Operations
  Alex Miranda – General Manager
  Sheldon Cipriani – Head Coach
  Sam Mitchell – Assistant Coach

Record

Year-by-year

References

Soccer clubs in Tampa, Florida
2011 establishments in Florida
2013 disestablishments in Florida
Association football clubs disestablished in 2013
Defunct soccer clubs in Florida
Association football clubs established in 2011
Sports in Hillsborough County, Florida